Igor José Marigo de Castro (born 25 August 1981 in Muriaé), commonly known as Igor or Igor Castro is a Brazilian footballer.

Club career

Brasiliense
In the 2005 season Igor Castro scored 11 goals in 36 games for Brasiliense. He also played for São Caetano in the Campeonato Brasileiro.

Zob Ahan
He moved to the Iranian club Zob Ahan in the summer of 2008 and was one of the top scorers of the league in his first season with 16 goals. Castro lead Zob Ahan to two straight Iran Pro League second-place finishes in 2009 and 2010. With the help of Castro Zob Ahan also won the Hazfi Cup in 2009. In 2010, he was one of the key players in Zob Ahan's run to the AFC Champions League final which they eventually lost.

Retirement
After spending 4 seasons in the Iran Pro League with Zob Ahan, in 2012 he transferred to Japanese club Yokohama F.C. but after an unsuccessful half-season he moved back to Iran once again but this time to Rah Ahan under coach Ali Daei. He was released at the end of the season by the club and later retired from professional football.

Club career statistics
Last Update: 20 March 2013 

 Assist Goals

References

Living people
1981 births
Brazilian footballers
Brazilian expatriate footballers
CR Flamengo footballers
Brasiliense Futebol Clube players
Associação Desportiva São Caetano players
Avaí FC players
Coritiba Foot Ball Club players
Zob Ahan Esfahan F.C. players
Campeonato Brasileiro Série A players
Campeonato Brasileiro Série B players
Persian Gulf Pro League players
Expatriate footballers in Iran
Expatriate footballers in Japan
Association football forwards